Ulu Pandan Bus Depot is the fourth bus depot to be built by the Land Transport Authority in Singapore. The depot is intended to accommodate the growing bus fleet over the next few years, under the Bus Service Enhancement Programme and Bus Contracting Model. The depot is bordered by Sungei Pandan, Sungei Ulu Pandan and Boon Lay Way, with Business Park Drive separating the depot complex, with the open-air bus park to the west of the road and the main depot building to the east of the road.

Phase 1, an open-air bus park to the west of Business Park Drive, is in operational since its completion in early 2017. SMRT Buses is temporarily using it to park buses overnight, as with the pre-handing over stages of the depot in line with other BCM bus depots, such as Bulim and Loyang bus depots.
Phase 2 is the main depot building, complete with offices and facilities for day-to-day bus operations, located to the east of Business Park Drive.

The depot is scheduled to be completed by 1st Quarter 2018, and it will be equipped with facilities for daily bus operations, bus repair/ maintenance, bus parking, offices, rest areas for bus drivers and canteen, being able to accommodate about 500 buses. The depot was officially opened by Minister for Transport Khaw Boon Wan on 27 October that year.

History
Contract RD300 for the design and construction of Ulu Pandan Depot was awarded to Tiong Seng Contractors Pte Ltd for roughly S$70 million. The bus depot spans 8.3 ha and was designed to accommodate about 500 buses. As it is located in close proximity to office developments in the area, the depot will likely be built with a noise barrier wall along its perimeter.

When fully completed in Q1 of 2018, the bus depot will be handed over to the successful tenderer of the Bukit Merah Bus Package, a group of 18 bus services which SBS Transit will be operating up till 1 September 2018. The depot would be handed over to the SBS Transit for outfitting and preparatory works before operations commenced on 18 November that year.

References

Bus garages
Bus stations in Singapore
2018 establishments in Singapore